The Strathfield rail underbridges are heritage-listed railway bridges located on the Main Southern and Main Western railway lines, in Strathfield in the Municipality of Strathfield local government area of New South Wales, Australia. The underbridges are also known as Strathfield rail underbridges (flyover) and Strathfield Flyover. The property is owned by RailCorp, an agency of the Government of New South Wales. It was added to the New South Wales State Heritage Register on 2 April 1999.

The underbridges can be viewed from Cooper Street, near its intersection with Leicester Ave, Strathfield.

History

Heritage listing 
As at 23 June 2016, the flyover is a rare item in NSW, built of brick to take the northern line suburban electric trains over the other tracks to avoid conflicts of traffic movement. The underbridge is a major structure at a busy intersection and is a good example of this type of structure.

The Strathfield rail underbridges were listed on the New South Wales State Heritage Register on 2 April 1999 having satisfied the following criteria.

The place possesses uncommon, rare or endangered aspects of the cultural or natural history of New South Wales.

This item is assessed as historically rare. This item is assessed as archaeologically rare. This item is assessed as socially rare.

See also 

List of railway bridges in New South Wales
Strathfield railway station

References

External links

Attribution 

New South Wales State Heritage Register
Strathfield, New South Wales
Railway bridges in New South Wales
Articles incorporating text from the New South Wales State Heritage Register
Brick bridges
Main Southern railway line, New South Wales
Main North railway line, New South Wales